Taplejung Airport , also known as Suketar Airport, is a domestic airport located in Phungling  serving Taplejung District, a district in Province No. 1 in Nepal. It is the main tourist gateway on the Kangchenjunga mountainous area and Pathibhara Devi Temple.

History
The airport started operations in October 1976. After its runway was blacktopped, Taplejung Airport restarted scheduled service in 2016. In 2018, plans were announced to upgrade the runway yet again.

Airlines and destinations

References

External links
 

Airports in Nepal
Koshi Province
1976 establishments in Nepal